, also known as Honda Teiken, was a Japanese mathematician in the Edo period.  He is the author of Seiyō sampō (Essence of Mathematics) which was published in 1781.

Sadasuke was the father of Fujita Kagen (1765–1821),  who is credited with publishing the first collection of sangaku problems.

Selected works
In a statistical overview derived from writings by and about Fujita Sadasuke, OCLC/WorldCat encompasses roughly 30 works in 30+ publications in 1 language and 30+ library holdings

 , 1769
 , 1781
 , 1796
 , 1807

See also
 Sangaku, the custom of presenting mathematical problems, carved in wood tablets, to the public in Shinto shrines
 Soroban, a Japanese abacus
 Japanese mathematics

Notes

References 
 Fukagawa, Hidetoshi and Tony Rothman. (2008). Sacred Mathematics: Japanese Temple Geometry. Princeton: Princeton University Press. ;   OCLC 181142099
 Nussbaum, Louis-Frédéric and Käthe Roth. (2005).  Japan encyclopedia. Cambridge: Harvard University Press. ;  OCLC 58053128
 David Eugene Smith and Yoshio Mikami. (1914).   A History of Japanese Mathematics. Chicago: Open Court Publishing.   OCLC 1515528 -- note alternate online, full-text copy at archive.org

18th-century Japanese mathematicians
19th-century Japanese mathematicians
Japanese writers of the Edo period
1734 births
1807 deaths